Julien Ghyoros was a Belgian composer and orchestral conductor. He was born as Julien Gogos on 18 November 1922 in Liège, Belgium, a son of Jeanne Dehairs and Konstantinos Gogos. He used the name Julien Ghyoros for professional purposes, and in 1969, he adopted it as his legal name. He died on 9 August 1978 in Brussels at the age of 55.

Biography

Early life and education
Born from a Belgian mother and an American father of Greek origin (Alexandria, Egypt), he grew up in his native city where he was a chorister up to the age of 13 at the Liège Opera and studied Cello, Harmony, Counterpoint, Fugue, and the Art of Conducting an Orchestra.

Family life
In 1958 he married Nora Van Moerbeke (1937-2018); together they had three children: Gregory (1959), Patricia (1961) and Nicolas (1974).

Musical maturity
At the age of 24 he composed the "American Rhapsody" (in memory of his father he never knew) as well as "Rocking child song particularly soft".
For many years he conducted the Opera of Liège as well as the International Musical Youth Orchestra.
Most of his life was dedicated to Opera and Chamber music.

Teaching 
As professor at the Conservatoire royal de Liège and later at the Conservatoire royal de Bruxelles he taught Harmony, Counterpoint, Fugue, Orchestra classes, and the Art of Conducting to students from Belgium and other countries.

Final years and death 
A few years before dying, he composed the "Sonate d'Irchonwelz", a viola concerto for his wife who was viola soloist at the National Orchestra of Belgium, as well as some piano pieces called "Greg et Pat".

Compositions 
Rhapsodie américaine
Rocking child song particularly soft
Greg et Pat
Conte à l'enfant au berceau
Concerto d'Athènes: pour alto et piano
Ballada pour violon et piano
Sonate d'Irchonwelz: en trois mouvements

External links
Tour with Mlle Gobert
Concert in Liège, performance of Conte à l'enfant au berceau
List of compositions
http://www2.ulg.ac.be/le15jour/Archives/139/cimi.shtml
http://www.ulg.ac.be/cms/c_193381/de/copie-de-cimi-l-orchestre-a-cordes-de-l-universite
Correspondence with Edmond Kinds
Julien Ghyoros conducts the National Orchestra of Belgium, music by Francis De Bourguignon and Gaston Brenta
Julien Ghyoros conducts the National Orchestra of Belgium, music by Marcel Poot
Julien Ghyoros conducts the Opera of Liège, music by René Barbier
Julien Ghyoros conducts the National Orchestra of Belgium, music by Eugène Ysaye, Raymond Moulaert
Julien Ghyoros conducts the Orchestre Philharmonique de Liège, music by Sergei Prokofiev, René Driesen
Julien Ghyoros conducts the brass instruments of the Orchestre Philharmonique de Liège, music by Léon Jongen, Raymond Moulaert, Richard Deguide, Gaston Brenta, Joseph Jongen and René Defossez (Album "Fanfares")
List of concerts, University of Wisconsin-Madison Libraries
The first concert of the Opera of Liège
List of concerts in Worldcat.org 

1922 births
1978 deaths
Belgian composers
Male composers
Belgian conductors (music)
Belgian people of Greek descent
Male conductors (music)
Musicians from Liège
20th-century conductors (music)
20th-century composers
20th-century Belgian male musicians